The House at 1 Bay Street is an historic house at 1 Bay Street in the Bay Village neighborhood of Boston, Massachusetts.  Dubbed the "tiniest house in Boston", it is a small 4-story brick structure, with a side gable roof and a brick foundation, occupying a lot of just .  Its front facade is two bays (and about ) wide, with the entrance recessed under an arch in the left bay, and sash windows in the other bays.  The house was built in 1830 by Benjamin Bosworth, and is a well-preserved example of Federal style.

The house was listed on the National Register of Historic Places in 1994.

See also 
 National Register of Historic Places listings in northern Boston, Massachusetts

References

Houses completed in 1830
Houses in Boston
National Register of Historic Places in Boston
1830 establishments in Massachusetts
Houses on the National Register of Historic Places in Suffolk County, Massachusetts

Federal architecture in Massachusetts